Baishe Township is a township under the administration of Lanxi in Zhejiang province, China. , it administers the following 20 villages:
Hongtangli Village
Shuige Village
Beishu Village
Tangbian Village
Qingzhushan Village
Qiaotou Village
Xitanxu Village
Tuzhai Village
Lingtang Village
Xiajiangwu Village
Xinzhai Village
Lingkou Village
Xiachen Village
Dashakou Village
Baijiu Village
Baijushe Village
Xinlihu Village
Zhongwang Village
Fanghualong Village
Zhiyuan Village

References 

Township-level divisions of Zhejiang
Lanxi, Zhejiang